Spyros Matentzidis (born on 23 July 1990) is a Greek footballer, currently playing for Kilkisiakos F.C. in the Football League 2 (Greece) as a central defender.

Career
Born in Kilkis, Matentzidis began playing football with Panthrakikos F.C. in 2009.

References

External links
 
Myplayer Profile
Profile at Onsports.gr

1990 births
Living people
Greek footballers
Panthrakikos F.C. players
AEK Athens F.C. players
Anagennisi Karditsa F.C. players
Diagoras F.C. players
Korinthos F.C. players
Association football central defenders
Footballers from Kilkis